The Mercury Cyclone is an automobile that was marketed by the Mercury division of Ford from 1964 to 1971.  Introduced in 1964 as the Mercury Comet Cyclone, the Cyclone replaced the S-22 as the performance-oriented version of the Mercury Comet model line.  The Cyclone became a distinct nameplate for the 1968 model year, as the Mercury Montego was phased in to replace the Comet.  

Within Mercury, the Cyclone was slotted between the Cougar pony car and the Marquis/Marauder full-size two-doors.  Though largely overshadowed by the Cougar, the Cyclone was positioned as a muscle car, representing the Mercury brand in racing and was a clone of the Ford Fairlane Thunderbolt.  

Four generations of the Cyclone were produced, with production ending after the 1971 model year.  For the 1972 model year, the Cyclone returned as an option package for the Montego; only 30 examples were produced.  Within the Mercury line, the Cyclone was not directly replaced. The Cougar XR7 was repackaged as a personal luxury version of the Montego for 1974.

First generation (1964-1965)

1964 
The Cyclone started as an option for the 1964 Mercury Comet. It had a spoked steering wheel and bucket seats. Some of the engine parts were chromed.

1965 
In the 1965 models, the engine was updated to the four-barrel carbureted version of the  unit, but generated .  This model had a few performance options, which included a handling package, a special fan, and a "power transfer" rear axle. Special features included a black-out, stand-up grille, bucket seats with sewn-through pleats, center console, chrome-plated wheel covers with lug nuts, engine "dress up kit", unique insignias, a vinyl roof in black or white and a "Power-Pac" gauge cluster for the heavily padded instrument panel.

Second generation (1966-1967)

1966 
The 1966 models underwent a major styling change. The body received "sculpturing" that ran the length of the car, and was based on the body of the Ford Fairlane. The models introduced new engines.

The GT featured car stripes, a fiberglass hood (bonnet) with two air scoops and several other performance options.

1967 
The 1967 model was produced with several engine options.

Neither the 1966 Cyclone nor the 1967 Cyclone used the  Ford FE engine that went into the standard Comet officially from the factory. For Comet Cyclones that were modified by Andy Hotton of Dearborn Steel Tubing with the optional 427 Ford FE  engine there were no changes to the body work similar to the Ford Fairlane Thunderbolt. Only a small, chromed badge with the designation '427' located on each front fender reflected the larger displacement engine under the hood (bonnet).

Third generation (1968-1969)

1968 
The 1968 models dropped "Comet" from their name. The Cyclones had a mid tire level body tape stripe.  The Cyclone GT's had an upper level body stripe, buckets, wide whitewall tires, special wheel covers, all vinyl interior, and the special handling package. 

Several engines were available for the Cyclones:

The  standard engine was available as either the two-barrel carburetor, which generated , or the four-barrel carburetor, which generated .

The  optional engine (standard for GT) was available as either the two-barrel carburetor, which generated , or the four-barrel carburetor, which generated .

The limited production 428CJ became available mid year and was rated 335hp

1969 
In 1969, the Cyclones had several engine options:

Spoiler

There was also a Cyclone Spoiler with a 390 Improved Performance "S" code engine that made 325Hp with the  735cfm Holley Carb

Spoiler II

Mercury produced a version of the Cyclone for NASCAR called the Cyclone Spoiler II. The model was available in two flavors. The street version featured a   Windsor block, and was used to enter into the NASCAR business. The racing version featured a  Boss block, which was the same engine as the one in the 1969 Boss Mustang.

Cobra Jet
Mercury also added a new model to the Cyclone line: the Cobra Jet (CJ). The engine had a Ram Air option, a 735 CFM Holley four-barrel carburetor although the option showed no quoted difference in horsepower rating. The Mercury Cyclone CJ had the following enhancements over the Cyclone and Cyclone GT: it had a blacked-out grille; dual exhausts; 3:50:1 axle ratio; engine dress-up kit (chromed parts); hood (bonnet) stripes; and a competition handling package.

Fourth generation (1970-1971)

1970 

The CJ model was dropped from the Cyclone lineup, and applied to some of the engine names in the series. Mercury thus featured the Cyclone, Cyclone Spoiler and Cyclone GT. The Cyclones consisted of 351 cid V8s and 429 cid V8 engines.

The standard engine for the base Cyclone was the  four-barrel with dual exhaust that was rated at  SAE gross ( net). It was the standard engine in the 1970 Mercury Marauder X-100 and was available in other full-size models. It featured a 575 CFM carburetor.

Two optional engines were available for the Cyclone. The 429 Cobra Jet was the  four-barrel with dual exhaust but without the Ram Air induction.  It was rated at  SAE gross ( net) and had a 720 CFM Rochester Quadrajet 4 BBL carburetor. The 429 Super Cobra Jet, which was part of a Drag Pack option, was a  four-barrel with dual exhaust and Ram Air induction, but it was rated at  SAE gross ( net), and had a 780 CFM Holley 4 BBL carburetor.

1970 Cyclone Spoiler
The Cyclone Spoiler was for the performance-minded with front and rear spoilers, black or white racing stripes that went from front to the rear of the car, an integrated functional hood scoop for ram air induction, 140 mph speedometer with a four-gauge suite including an 8,000 rpm tachometer with adjustable red line,  vinyl bucket seats, dual racing mirrors and a competition suspension package.  The 429 Cobra Jet with Ram Air was the standard engine for the Cyclone Spoiler, with the 429 Super Cobra Jet with Drag Pak and Super Drag Pak optional. The Super Cobra Jet upgraded the block to four main bolts and provided a mechanical flat-tappet camshaft, and the carburetor was changed from a 720 cfm Rochester QuadraJet to a 780 cfm Holley. Standard with the SCJ was the Drag Pack, this package added a front-mounted engine oil cooler and a 3.91 ratio gear, while the Super Drag Pack offered a 4.30 ratio gear and a Detroit "no spin" locker differential.  Colors for the Spoiler were limited to Competition Yellow, Competition Blue, pastel blue, Competition Gold, Competition Green and Competition Orange but for a premium Ford included the 'color of your dreams' program, and 31 buyers took advantage.

Ford had intended to continue the Spoiler II option for 1970 with an even more aggressive nose profile. One prototype was built.

1970 Cyclone GT
For the sporting gentleman that placed more emphasis in style than speed, there was the Cyclone GT. The basic package offered comfort weave bucket seats, full-length console, twin racing mirrors, integrated hood scoop that could be made functional for optional ram air induction, hide-away headlights, three pod tail lights and unique lower-body line trim. The cost of all of this style was the having a 351 Cleveland big block with 2-barrel carburetor and a three-speed manual transmission as standard fare. However, there were options, and they were good ones. The 4-barrel version of the Cleveland small block followed by a set of 429 cid big blocks up to the Super Cobra Jet and the Drag Pak plus a four-speed transmission and a selection of automatics. Although early sales literature shows the BOSS 429 as an option, none were actually built. An oddity with the GT was the Action Special Package, for which 933 buyers pulled the trigger. Most notable about the package was the loss of the comfort weave buckets in favor of a spectrum stripe bench seat.

1971 
In 1971, the Cyclone had some minor styling updates; most noticeable was center section of the grill received a larger ring in the gun site with the GT receiving a unique badge. The Spoiler received a revised stripe package, and the rear spoiler was painted flat black, and the Base Cyclone now had the integrated hood scoop like the GT and Spoiler. Under the hood things were different as well. Gone was the Super Cobra Jet and Drag Pak options, and the base engine for the Base and Spoiler became the M code 351 Cleveland with 4-barrel carburetor. For the Spoiler, Ram Air also became option as opposed to part of the package for 1970. Beyond minor changes in the color palette and available options, the 1971 Cyclone line was a carry over from 1970. The Cyclone competed for buyers at Lincoln-Mercury dealerships in the performance coupe segment when it was decided to offer the De Tomaso Pantera exotic sports car beginning in 1971.

Fifth generation (1972)

1972 
For 1972, the Mercury Montego was fully redesigned with body-on-frame construction, front and rear coil spring suspension, and a new shorter 114-inch wheelbase for two-door models. The Cyclone was reverted to a performance option package available on Mercury Montego, Mercury Montego MX two-door, and the Mercury Montego GT. The package included one of two engines, the   Q-code 4-barrel Cleveland Cobra Jet small block engine rated at  SAE net or the  N-code 4-barrel rated at  SAE net. The Cyclone option group included a functional Ram Air induction through twin integrated hood scoops, Traction-Lok (limited slip) differential, F70-14 for  cars, and G70-14 tires for  powered cars, hub caps and trim rings, body striping and identification, three-spoke steering wheel and dual racing mirrors.

Early Mercury factory literature showed this option available, while later editions did not have any information on the Cyclone package.  Only 30 1972 Cyclone package cars were produced, 29 Montego GT's and one Montego MX.  Twenty of these Cyclones were equipped with the  engine.

Use in motorsport 

During its production, the Mercury (Comet) Cyclone represented the brand in motorsport.  Initially gaining use in drag racing, the Cyclone was raced in NASCAR alongside the Fairlane and its Torino successor, with the fourth-generation Cyclone becoming one of the most dominant body styles ever used in Winston Cup racing.  In the 1968 Daytona 500, the Cyclone took both first and second place.  The Wood Brothers Racing #21 1971 Cyclone still holds a NASCAR record, for 18 wins out of 32 races.  For the 1972 Daytona 500, 12 of the 40 cars in the race were Cyclones.  

The dominance of the Cyclone would lead to the development of the "Aero Warriors", body styles of production muscle cars aerodynamically optimized for Winston Cup racing (following their homologation).  Alongside the Ford Torino Talladega, the Cyclone Spoiler II was introduced to compete with Dodge Charger Daytona and Plymouth Superbird. Although a redesigned Spoiler II was developed in 1970, only a single prototype was produced (alongside three Torino King Cobra counterparts). 

For 1971, NASCAR changed its rules to end the production of aerodynamically-optimized cars, increasing their homologation requirements and restricting their engine displacement.

Following the shift of the Cougar from the Mustang to the Montego chassis, Mercury-body NASCAR teams phased out the Cyclone in favor of the Cougar XR7, introduced in 1974.

Production

References

External links
 www.oldride.com Mercury Cyclone

Cyclone
Rear-wheel-drive vehicles
Mid-size cars
Coupés
Muscle cars
Cars introduced in 1964
1970s cars